Long Beach is a suburb of Batemans Bay in Eurobodalla Shire, New South Wales, Australia. It lies on the north bank of the Clyde estuary, north of Batemans Bay and 274 km south of Sydney.

The community is served by the Long Beach Community Association (LBCA) www.longbeach.org.au

References

Towns in the South Coast (New South Wales)
Eurobodalla Shire
Coastal towns in New South Wales